The letter Ꞅ (minuscule: ꞅ) is an Insular script form of the letter S. The uppercase is encoded in Unicode at U+A784 , and the lowercase is encoded at U+A785 . 

It should not be confused with the long-legged r, which is an obsolete IPA symbol.

S